Lurganville (historically Lurganavill or Lurganaveel) is a small village and townland in County Down, Northern Ireland. In the 2001 Census it had a population of 102 people. It is situated in the Lisburn City Council area. Locally significant buildings include St Colman's Church, which is a listed building, and the Parochial House.

Historically the village has been referred to locally as Kilwarlin after the parish in which it lies. Road signs identifying the village as Lurganville, in the Lisburn & Castlereagh City Council area, have been erected recently (2019) on the approach roads to it.

References 

NI Neighbourhood Information System

See also 
List of villages in Northern Ireland

Villages in County Down
Townlands of County Down
Civil parish of Moira, County Down